Ceranthia is a genus of flies in the family Tachinidae. Some consider this to be a subgenus of Siphona, most European workers seem content that this is a genus in its own right.

Species
C. abdominalis (Robineau-Desvoidy, 1830)
C. angusta Tachi & Sama, 2005
C. flavipes (Coquillett, 1897)
C. japonica Mesnil, 1963
C. jocosa (Villeneuve, 1942)
C. lacrymans Mesnil, 1954
C. lichtwardtiana (Villeneuve, 1931)
C. livoricolor Mesnil, 1977
C. nigra Tachi & Sama, 2005
C. pallida Herting, 1959
C. plorans Mesnil, 1954
C. scutellata Mesnil, 1954
C. setigera Tachi & Sama, 2005
C. sulfurea Mesnil, 1971
C. tenuipalpis (Villeneuve, 1921)
C. terrosa Mesnil, 1954
C. tristella Herting, 1966
C. verneri Andersen, 1996

References

Tachininae
Tachinidae genera
Taxa named by Jean-Baptiste Robineau-Desvoidy